Ray Lopez (born Rafael Antonio Pérez; August 22, 1967) is an American former police officer with the Los Angeles Police Department (LAPD) and the central figure in the LAPD Rampart scandal. An officer with the Community Resources Against Street Hoodlums (CRASH) task force, Pérez was involved in numerous crimes and corruption, notably the shooting and framing of Javier Ovando, in addition to the theft and resale of at least $800,000 of cocaine from LAPD evidence lockers.

Pérez is accused of being a member of the Bloods, a notorious Los Angeles gang, and of murdering The Notorious B.I.G. at the behest of producer Suge Knight of Death Row Records.
When Pérez was finally arrested, he implicated 70 other Rampart Division officers in various forms of misconduct, ranging from bad shootings to consuming alcohol while on duty. Over 100 convictions were overturned based on Pérez's testimony.

Private life
Pérez was born in Humacao, Puerto Rico in 1967 and moved to Brooklyn, New York, in 1972; some months later he moved to Paterson, New Jersey, and then he would eventually move to Philadelphia, Pennsylvania in 1982.

Pérez graduated from high school in 1985 and enlisted in the United States Marine Corps, where he was stationed in Maine and California. He was hired by the LAPD after leaving the military in 1989. Prior to this, he had been a reject and passed over for hiring by background investigators from several other departments in Southern California. He also looked and acted in a "gang like" manner.

Career
After serving on routine patrol duties, Pérez was transferred to a narcotics unit in 1992. In 1995, he was transferred to Rampart Division and assigned to CRASH, an anti-gang unit given a long leash by the LAPD. Pérez gained a reputation as a tough and effective officer, valued for his fluency in Spanish and his knowledge of L.A.'s gangs.

Criminal activities

On October 12, 1996, Pérez and his partner Nino Durden shot and framed an unarmed gang member Javier Ovando. Ovando, who was left paralyzed, was sentenced to 23 years in prison based on the officers' false testimony.

On August 25, 1998, Pérez, then age 31 and a nine-year veteran of the Los Angeles Police Department, was arrested for stealing  of cocaine from a department property room. (The theft was originally suspected to be an attempt at framing fellow officer Frank Lyga in retaliation for the shooting of Pérez's friend, Kevin Gaines.) The cocaine was estimated to be worth $800,000 on the street. His December 1998 trial ended as a mistrial. To avoid a second trial and the possible conviction of his second wife, who according to authorities may have known about Pérez's illegal activities, on September 8, 1999, he cut a plea bargain with authorities. In his plea bargain he revealed the Rampart scandal in exchange for immunity for his misconduct.

On November 6, 1997, fellow CRASH officer David Mack and two accomplices stole $722,000 during a robbery at a Bank of America branch near the University of Southern California campus.

Criminal charges

February 2000
In February 2000, Pérez was sentenced to five years in prison for stealing eight pounds of cocaine from an LAPD evidence locker. At his sentencing, Pérez read a statement in which he said, "I cheated on my wife. I cheated on my employer, and I cheated on all of you, the people of Los Angeles".

July 24, 2001 release
On July 24, 2001, due to his plea bargain Pérez was released from prison and placed on parole.

December 17, 2001 – Federal charges
Pérez pled guilty to new charges resulting from the shooting of Javier Ovando. He was charged with 2 felony counts; (1) conspiracy to violate Ovando's civil rights; (2) Possessing a firearm with an eliminated serial number, the firearm was used as evidence to frame Ovando. He was sentenced on May 6, 2002, to serve two years in federal prison. He was released in June 2004.

October 31, 2006 felony count
On October 31, 2006, Pérez pleaded no contest to a felony count of perjury before the Torrance Superior Court. 

Pérez, who legally changed his name to Ray Lopez, was arrested in July by Department of Motor Vehicles investigators while visiting his federal parole officer in Inglewood. Pérez pleaded no contest to lying on his application for a California driver's license on June 30, 2005. Pérez was sentenced to an additional three years' probation and 300 hours of community service.

After his release from prison he settled with his family in Inglewood. Then in 2006 he had a second divorce from Denise. He then moved and lived in many cities like Redondo Beach and San Diego and had a series of different jobs. He currently lives in Chino Hills and, as of May 2015, is reported to work as a limo driver. He was seen driving for producer Harvey Weinstein.

Questions of credibility

The credibility of Pérez has been undermined by his testimony in several internal affairs investigations in which three officers, including Brian Liddy, accused of crimes or misconduct were found not guilty or the charges were dropped. He has failed several lie-detector tests and has made several errors in his testimony in the past. The issue of Pérez's credibility has already led to at least 5 cases of either dropped charges or acquittal.

Murder of The Notorious B.I.G. allegations

In March, 1997, influential rapper Christopher Wallace, who was known as The Notorious B.I.G., was murdered in a Los Angeles drive-by shooting.

On April 16, 2007, Wallace's relatives filed a wrongful death suit against the city of Los Angeles, former LAPD officer Rafael Pérez and his partner former Officer Nino Durden, seeking unspecified general, compensatory and punitive monetary damages. The lawsuit was filed in the Los Angeles Superior Court by Wallace's mother, his widow Faith Evans, and his two children.

The lawsuit states that Pérez, Nino Durden, their partner former officer David Mack, and "certain unknown persons" were responsible for the death of Christopher Wallace. The rapper was shot to death on March 9, 1997, as he and Sean Combs left the 11th Annual Soul Train Music Awards after-party held at the Petersen Automotive Museum on Wilshire Boulevard in Los Angeles. The lawsuit states the killing was committed "in a very efficient, organized and professional manner, suggesting that a high degree of coordination and planning preceded his murder." The suit further alleges that Pérez admitted to the LAPD that he and David Mack "conspired to murder, and participated in the murder of Christopher Wallace." It was alleged that Pérez was on duty during the night of March 9, 1997 but there was no evidence of that allegation.

Christopher Wallace's murder is believed to have been in retaliation for the murder of Tupac Shakur. Tupac Shakur was a member of Death Row Records, run by Marion "Suge" Knight. Knight is known to have hired off-duty Rampart cops for security such as Kevin Gaines, who was shot to death by fellow LAPD officer Frank Lyga on March 18, 1997. Knight, who grew up in Compton, is well known for his ties to the Bloods. Following his arrest, detectives found several photos of Rafael Pérez flashing Blood gang signs. The connection between Pérez and the murder of Christopher Wallace has long been a source of speculation by the LAPD.

The current wrongful death lawsuit states that Pérez was a member of "a violent street gang associated with Death Row Records, and that he was partly responsible for Wallace's death."

In popular culture
In the 2001 film Training Day, Denzel Washington said he emulated the style of Rafael Pérez to give authenticity to his portrayal of corrupt LAPD cop Alonzo Harris. The character's vehicle has the license plate ORP 967, which is said to stand for Officer Rafael Pérez, born in 1967.
The television series The Shield is based on the Los Angeles Rampart scandal, and the show's main character, Officer Vic Mackey, is based loosely on Rafael Pérez.
 The TV series Mugshots a crime documentary show from Court TV (now TruTV) released Rafael Perez - LAPD's Notorious Cop that showcased Pérez's criminal actions.
 Pérez is portrayed by Neil Brown Jr. in the 2018 film City of Lies, based on the Rampart scandal and the CRASH officers alleged involvement in the murder of Biggie Smalls.

References

1967 births
Living people
People from Humacao, Puerto Rico
American people of Puerto Rican descent
American police officers convicted of crimes
American perjurers
Bloods
Criminals from California
Los Angeles Police Department officers
Police officers convicted of planting evidence
Police officers convicted of drug trafficking
Prisoners and detainees of the United States federal government
Puerto Rican prisoners and detainees
Puerto Rican United States Marines
Puerto Rican criminals
United States Marines